Barnwell is a village in southern Alberta, Canada.

History 
In the late 19th century, a boxcar was located on a rail siding in what is now Barnwell. It was used as a telegraph office for local settlers and the railroad, and the area was named Woodpecker. In 1908, the area was renamed Bountiful to correspond to the local school district. A short while later, it was renamed to Barnwell because another community already had the name of Bountiful. The name Barnwell came from William Barnwell, a longtime employee of the Canadian Pacific Railway.

In the early 1900s migrating members of the Church of Jesus Christ of Latter-day Saints, colonized Barnwell as well as other Southern Alberta areas. "By 1911 Latter-day Saints had established eighteen new communities in southern Alberta, and 10,000 Saints, mostly farmers and their families, lived in the area of southwest Alberta alone."

Demographics 

In the 2016 Census of Population conducted by Statistics Canada, the Village of Barnwell recorded a population of 947 living in 260 of its 266 total private dwellings, a  change from its 2011 population of 771.

The population of the Village of Barnwell according to its 2015 municipal census is 960, a  change from its 2011 municipal census population of 812.

Notable residents 
 "Suicide Ted" Elder (1897-1981), was seven years the World Champion Trick and Fancy Rider from 1926 to 1932, his father Jonathan Pratt Elder was one of the founders of Barnwell.
 Lawrence Peterson (1873-1951), was a member of the Legislative Assembly of Alberta from 1921 to 1930, representing the United Farmers Party. He served as the second Bishop of the Barnwell Ward of The Church of Jesus Christ of Latter-Day Saints from 1915 to 1925. He is one of the founders of Barnwell.

See also 
List of communities in Alberta
List of villages in Alberta

References

External links 

1980 establishments in Alberta
Latter-day Saint settlements in Canada
Villages in Alberta